
Gmina Złoty Stok is an urban-rural gmina (administrative district) in Ząbkowice Śląskie County, Lower Silesian Voivodeship, in south-western Poland, on the Czech border.

Neighbouring gminas
Gmina Złoty Stok is bordered by the gminas of Bardo, Kamieniec Ząbkowicki, Kłodzko, Lądek-Zdrój and Paczków. It also borders the Czech Republic.

Villages
Apart from the town of Złoty Stok, the gmina contains the villages of Błotnica, Chwalisław, Laski, Mąkolno and Płonica.

Twin towns – sister cities

Gmina Złoty Stok is twinned with:
 Javorník, Czech Republic
 Szamocin, Poland

References

Zloty Stok
Ząbkowice Śląskie County